"July" is a song by English rock band Ocean Colour Scene (OCS). Released on 26 June 2000 as a double A-side with "I Am the News", the single reached number 31 on the UK Singles Chart and number 41 in Ireland. It was the third and final single released from their fourth studio album, One from the Modern (1999). The song is based on an earlier song called "Winter in July".

The single was used as the theme tune to the television series Lock, Stock..., the spin-off from Lock, Stock and Two Smoking Barrels which had used "Hundred Mile High City".

Track listings
UK CD1
 "July" (new version)
 "I Am the News" (new version)
 "July" (Forza Moderna mix)

UK CD2
 "July" (live at the London Astoria)
 "I Am the News" (live at the Dublin Point)
 "This Understanding" (live at Stirling Castle)
 "This Understanding" (live enhanced video)

UK 7-inch single
A. "July" (new version)
AA. "I Am the News" (new version)

Charts
All entries charted as "July" / "I Am the News".

References

Ocean Colour Scene songs
1999 songs
2000 singles
Island Records singles
Song recordings produced by Brendan Lynch (music producer)
Songs written by Damon Minchella
Songs written by Oscar Harrison
Songs written by Simon Fowler
Songs written by Steve Cradock